Aeranthes antennophora is a species of orchid native to Madagascar.

References

antennophora
Orchids of Africa
Plants described in 1938
Taxa named by Joseph Marie Henry Alfred Perrier de la Bâthie